Hrishikesh Roy (born 1 February 1960) is a judge of Supreme Court of India. He is former Chief Justice of the Kerala High Court. He is also former judge of the Gauhati High Court.

Career
In 1982, Roy earned a Bachelor of Arts from the University of Delhi. He was initially enrolled under the Bar Council of Delhi thereafter shifted to Guwahati. He served as the senior government advocate for the State of Arunachal Pradesh, standing counsel for the Assam State Electricity Board and Karbi Anglong Autonomous Council. He was designated as senior advocate of Gauhati High Court on 21 December 2004. Roy became an additional judge of Gauhati High Court on 12 October 2006 and permanent judge on 15 July 2008. In his career he was the Executive Head of the Assam State Legal Services Authority and nominated as a member of the National Judicial Academic Council presided by the Chief Justice of India.

Chief justice of High Court
On 29 May 2018, Roy was transferred from the Gauhati High Court to Kerala High Court as the acting chief justice. He became the permanent chief justice of the High Court on 8 August 2018 after the retirement of Justice Antony Dominic.

Supreme Court of India 
He was elevated as one of the sitting judges of the Supreme Court of India on 23 September 2019.

References

1960 births
Living people
21st-century Indian judges
21st-century Indian lawyers
Chief Justices of the Kerala High Court
Delhi University alumni
Judges of the Gauhati High Court
Justices of the Supreme Court of India
People from Gangtok